Siri Sirimal is a Sri Lankan television series directed by Sunil Costha that aired on Rupavahini from 2007 to 2008. It was adapted from Mark Twain's  1876 novel The Adventures of Tom Sawyer. The theme song and sound track for the series were composed by Dinesh Subasinghe (for which he won the Golden award for best music director at the 2009 SIGNIS Awards).

Plot 
Sirimal (Ishan Shamsudeen) is a mischievous young boy who  skips school to join Rosa, but changes his idea after he sees the young Daughter of Richman (Lusion Bulathsinghala). He tries to sneak back into class. Sirimal's teacher (Edward Gunawardhana) makes him sit with the girls, which Sirimal actually likes since he is able to sit next to them. He is also sits beside Amy Lawrence, a friend with whom he became "engaged". She still has romantic feelings for him but he is too transfixed by the Richman girls to notice her.

He was a poor boy who lives with his Aunt. He steals food and gets caught by his Aunt(Geetha Kanthy Jayakody) who beats and punishes him. He runs away to the small jungle near the river where he meets a boy  who is elder to him. Almost instinctually (but probably a social facet of village boys), they fight and Sirimal tries to become prince over them.

Later in the Story  Sirimal teams up with two other mischievous boys Rosa and Dasa, vowing never to be separated from each other. One night they come across three villagers, Gunaya (Cletus Mendis), Bempi(Kumara Thirimadhura) and Kattandiya at a cemetery and while sharing some stolen money they fight and Kattandiya is killed by Gunaya. Gunaya escapes by framing innocent Bempi. When the murder trial starts and Bempi is on the verge of being convicted, Sirimal & Rosa testify and the verdict changes.

Later, the same kids try to find a treasure at a haunted house. When they reach there they see that it belongs to thieves and they are running away with the hidden treasure. They follow but fail to catch the thieves . When Sirimal and Rosa try to catch the thieves they stumble into a dangerous arena and thwart it.

Cast and crew

Cast

Isham Shamsudeen 
Geetha Kanthi Jayakody
Edward Gunawardena 
Maureen Charunee 
Kumara Thirimedura 
Lucian Bulathsinghala 
Sahan Kothalawela 
Tony Ranasinghe 
Cletus Mendis 
Gamini Jayalath 
Daya Alwis 
Asela Jayakody 
Chandra Kaluarachchi 
Saman Almeda 
G. R. Perera 
Chathura Rajasuriya 
Chamara Ranga 
Isuri Navodya 
Tharaka Nadishani 
Tharuka Madushan

Crew
Director-Sunil Costha
Cinema Autography-Prabath Roshan
Editor-Kumara Galgamuwa
Music score-Dinesh Subasinghe
Vocals-Madawa Senivirathna & DRC Members Choir
Art directors-Sunil Wijeratne & Sena Mabulage 
Make up-Priyantha Dissanayake 
Production executive- Nimal Wijesiri Senadeera
Assistant Director- Newton Gunasekara

Music
The score, which uses string and brass orchestra, was composed by Dinesh Subasinghe. The theme song "Mandho Kawdho" was very popular among children in Sri Lanka in 2007–2009.. It was sung by Madhawa Senivirathan and the Dee R Cee members vocal group. To conjure up the time period of the plot (the 1940s), Subasinghe used a digital effect which recreated the sound of an old gramophone record in some parts of the score.

References

External links
Siri Sirimal at IMDb

Sri Lankan drama television series
2000s Sri Lankan television series
2007 Sri Lankan television series debuts
2008 Sri Lankan television series endings
Sri Lanka Rupavahini Corporation original programming